Concepción Hernández Díaz (born 13 October 1972 in Murcia) is a goalball player from Spain.  She is blind and is a B2 type goalball player. She played goalball at the 1996 Summer Paralympics where the Spanish women's team finished in 4th place. She played goalball at the 2000 Summer Paralympics where the Spanish women's team finished second, winning a silver medal.

References

External links 
 
 

1975 births
Living people
Paralympic goalball players of Spain
Paralympic silver medalists for Spain
Paralympic medalists in goalball
Goalball players at the 1996 Summer Paralympics
Goalball players at the 2000 Summer Paralympics
Medalists at the 2000 Summer Paralympics
Sportspeople from Murcia